Thor Temple is a -elevation summit located in the Grand Canyon, in Coconino County of northern Arizona, United States. According to the Köppen climate classification system, Thor Temple is located in a cold semi-arid climate zone.

Thor Temple is named for Thor, the hammer-wielding god associated with lightning, thunder, and storms in Germanic mythology, and son of Wotan. This name was applied by geologist François E. Matthes, in keeping with Clarence Dutton's practice of naming geographical features in the Grand Canyon after mythological deities. A variant name for this landform is "Thors Hammer." This geographical feature's name was officially adopted in 1906 by the U.S. Board on Geographic Names.

Geology

Thor Temple is composed of strata of the Pennsylvanian-Permian Supai Group. Further down are strata of Mississippian Redwall Limestone, Cambrian Tonto Group, and finally Proterozoic Unkar Group at creek level. Precipitation runoff from Thor Temple drains southwest to the Colorado River via Clear Creek.

See also
 Geology of the Grand Canyon area

References

External links 

 Weather forecast: National Weather Service
 Thor Temple from Francois Matthes Point. 1969 photo

Grand Canyon
Landforms of Coconino County, Arizona
Mountains of Arizona
Mountains of Coconino County, Arizona
North American 2000 m summits
Colorado Plateau
Grand Canyon National Park
Grand Canyon, North Rim